Michael Paul Kube-McDowell (born August 29, 1954), also known as Michael McDowell or Michael P. McDowell, is an American science fiction and non-fiction author.

Background 
Born Michael Paul McDowell on August 29, 1954 (Philadelphia, Pennsylvania), he attended St. Joseph's High School (Camden, New Jersey) (Class of 1972) and Michigan State University.

Writing career 
Kube-McDowell has written for television, been a stringer for a daily newspaper, and published short fiction, reviews, assorted nonfiction and erotica. He was honored for teaching excellence by the 1985 White House Commission on Presidential Scholars. Kube-McDowell's short fiction has been featured in Analog, Isaac Asimov's Science Fiction Magazine and The Magazine of Fantasy and Science Fiction, as well as anthologies After the Flames and Perpetual Light. Three of his stories have been adapted as episodes of the TV series Tales from the Darkside. Outside of science fiction Kube-McDowell is the author of more than 500 nonfiction articles on subjects ranging from space careers to "scientific creationism" to an award-winning four-part series on the state of American education. Kube-McDowell's literary works have been recognized and highlighted at Michigan State University in their Michigan Writers Series.

Bibliography

Series

The Trigon Disunity
Emprise (1985) 
Enigma (1986)
Empery (1987)
Star Wars : The Black Fleet Crisis
Before the Storm (1996)
Shield of Lies (1996)
Tyrant's Test (1996)

Novels

Alternities (1988)
Isaac Asimov's Robot City: Odyssey (1987)
The Quiet Pools (1990)	
Exile (1992)	
The Trigger (1999) (with Arthur C. Clarke)
Vectors (2002)

Young adult novels
Thieves of Light (1987) (writing as Michael Hudson)

Short stories
 I Shall Have a Flight to Glory (1992) (collected in Mike Resnick's alternate history anthology Alternate Presidents)
 The Inga-Binga Affair (1992) (collected in Mike Resnick's alternate history anthology Alternate Kennedys)
 Because Thou Lovest the Burning-Ground (1993) (collected in Mike Resnick's alternate history anthology Alternate Warriors)

Awards

 Hugo Best Novel nominee (1991) : The Quiet Pools
 Philip K. Dick nominee (1985) : Emprise
 Pegasus Award for Best Performer (1994) as a member of the Black Book Band

References

External links 

 Official site
 

1954 births
Living people
Writers from Camden, New Jersey
20th-century American novelists
21st-century American novelists
American male novelists
American science fiction writers
Michigan State University alumni
American male short story writers
Writers from Philadelphia
Indiana University South Bend alumni
Michigan State University faculty
20th-century American short story writers
21st-century American short story writers
20th-century American male writers
21st-century American male writers
Novelists from Pennsylvania
Novelists from New Jersey
Novelists from Michigan
Filkers